Miłony  is a village in the administrative district of Gmina Różan, within Maków County, Masovian Voivodeship, in east-central Poland. It is located about 4km north west of Różan

References

Villages in Maków County